K. Parasuraman was born on 15 December 1960 in Pudur Village, Orathanadu Taluk at Thanjavur District, Tamil Nadu. He is an Indian politician and Member of Parliament elected from Tamil Nadu. He was elected to the Lok Sabha from Thanjavur constituency as an Anna Dravida Munnetra Kazhagam candidate in 2014 election.

References 

All India Anna Dravida Munnetra Kazhagam politicians
Living people
India MPs 2014–2019
Lok Sabha members from Tamil Nadu
1961 births
People from Thanjavur district